Mónica Malavassi Álvarez (born 25 April 1989) is a Costa Rican basketball player who plays as a point guard and a former footballer who played as a forward. She has played for both the Costa Rica women's national basketball team and the Costa Rica women's national football team.

Basketball career

International career
Malavassi played for Costa Rica at three Centrobasket Women editions (2006, 2008 and 2018) and the 2014 Central American and Caribbean Games.

Football career

Club career
Malavassi has played in her country for Arenal.

International career
Malavassi has represented Costa Rica at the 2008 CONCACAF Women's U-20 Championship. She capped at senior level during the 2010 CONCACAF Women's World Cup Qualifying.

References 

1989 births
Living people
Sportspeople from San José, Costa Rica
Costa Rican women's basketball players
Point guards
Competitors at the 2014 Central American and Caribbean Games
Costa Rican women's footballers
Women's association football forwards
Costa Rica women's international footballers